The Hoping Power Plant is a coal-fired power plant in Xiulin Township, Hualien County, Taiwan. With the installed capacity of 1,320 MW, the power plant is the fourth largest coal-fired power plant in Taiwan.

Generation
Electricity generated by the power plant supplies the major load located in north of Taiwan.

Ownership
The power plant is fully owned by Ho-Ping Power Company. The equity interest is divided to CLP Group (20%), Mitsubishi Corporation (20%) and Taiwan Cement Corporation (60%).

Events

2017
On 29 July 2017, a transmission tower for the outgoing lines of the plant collapsed due to Typhoon Nesat which caused the electricity supply to Taiwan down by 4%. The tower was reconstructed on 11 August 2017 and completed in the following day, which became the fastest power line reparation in the history of Taiwan. On 13 August, the plant resumed its operation and reached its full generating capacity the day after.

On 15 August 2017, the plant tripped due to the break down of one of its generator causing a loss of 650 MW power generation.

On 23 August 2017, a furnace pipe of generator no. 2 broke, causing a drop in electricity generation.

Transportation
Hoping Power Plant is accessible within walking distance North East from Heping Station of Taiwan Railways.

See also

 List of power stations in Taiwan
 List of coal power stations
 Electricity sector in Taiwan

References 

2002 establishments in Taiwan
Buildings and structures in Hualien County
Coal-fired power stations in Taiwan
Energy infrastructure completed in 2002